Sharon Margaret Rackham, OAM (born 25 July 1974) is an Australian Paralympic athlete.

Biography
She was born on 25 July 1974 in Tongatapu, Tonga. 
She won a gold medal in the T20 200m at the 1996 Summer Paralympics in Atlanta, for which she received a Medal of the Order of Australia, and a silver medal in the 200 m T20 at the 2000 Summer Paralympics. In 2000, she received an Australian Sports Medal.

References

External links
 Sharon Rackham at Australian Athletics Historical Results
 

Living people
Paralympic athletes of Australia
Paralympic gold medalists for Australia
Paralympic silver medalists for Australia
Athletes (track and field) at the 1996 Summer Paralympics
Athletes (track and field) at the 2000 Summer Paralympics
Intellectual Disability category Paralympic competitors
Recipients of the Medal of the Order of Australia
Recipients of the Australian Sports Medal
1974 births
Medalists at the 1996 Summer Paralympics
Medalists at the 2000 Summer Paralympics
ACT Academy of Sport alumni
Competitors in athletics with intellectual disability
Paralympic medalists in athletics (track and field)
Australian female sprinters